Ricardo Luís Chaby Mangas (born 19 March 1998) is a Portuguese professional footballer who plays for Primeira Liga club Boavista as a left-back.

Club career

Aves
Born in Olhão on the Algarve, Mangas spent most of his development at Benfica. After leaving for Aves in 2017, he was immediately loaned out for the season to third-tier club Mirandela, where he made his senior debut.

On 7 December 2019, Mangas made his professional debut in Primeira Liga for Aves, playing the full 90 minutes of a 1–0 home win against Braga; he was watched by Atlético Madrid forward and Portugal international João Félix, his long-term teammate at Benfica. He played 20 games as the team from Vila das Aves were relegated in last place, scoring once to open a 2–1 away victory over Marítimo on 2 February 2020, and being sent off on 11 June in a 2–0 loss at fellow strugglers Tondela.

Boavista
Mangas returned to the top tier on 4 August 2020 on a four-year deal at Boavista. He scored on his debut on 19 September, in a 3–3 draw at Nacional.

On 4 August 2021, Mangas joined Bordeaux on a one-year loan with a buying option. He made his Ligue 1 debut 11 days later in a 2–2 draw at Marseille, and scored his first goal on 12 September in a 3–2 home loss against Lens. The team ended the season relegated for the first time in 30 years, with Mangas averaging 4.1 out of 10 for his performances according to local newspaper Sud-Ouest.

Honours
Benfica
UEFA Youth League runner-up: 2016–17

References

External links

1998 births
Living people
People from Olhão
Sportspeople from Faro District
Portuguese footballers
Association football defenders
Primeira Liga players
Campeonato de Portugal (league) players
C.D. Aves players
SC Mirandela players
Boavista F.C. players
Ligue 1 players
FC Girondins de Bordeaux players
Portugal youth international footballers
Portuguese expatriate footballers
Expatriate footballers in France
Portuguese expatriate sportspeople in France